Gorenci is a village in the municipality of Debarca, North Macedonia. It used to be part of the former municipality of Mešeišta. It is located close to Ohrid Airport.

Demographics
During the Ottoman period, Gorenci was a chiflik settlement and inhabited by an Orthodox Macedonian population. During the course of the 20th century, Albanians have settled in the village.

As of the 2021 census, Gorenci had 223 residents with the following ethnic composition:
Macedonians 87
Persons for whom data are taken from administrative sources 75
Albanians 57
Others 4

According to the 2002 census, the village had a total of 316 inhabitants. Ethnic groups in the village include:

Macedonians 169
Albanians 145
Others 2

References

External links

Villages in Debarca Municipality
Albanian communities in North Macedonia